Garth Brooks is the debut studio album of American country music artist Garth Brooks, released on April 12, 1989, through Capitol Nashville. It was both a critical and chart success, peaking at No. 13 on the Billboard 200 and at No. 2 on the Top Country Albums chart. The album has been certified diamond by the Recording Industry Association of America (RIAA) for shipments over ten million copies.

Background

Brooks commented on the album, saying:

Singles

This album contains Brooks' earliest hits, for instance his first ever single, "Much Too Young (To Feel This Damn Old)", which peaked at No. 8 on the Country Billboard Charts in 1989. It put the name of an independent cowboy singer, Chris LeDoux, into the mainstream due to the lyric "A worn out tape of Chris LeDoux" Two other strong starts include his first No. 1, "If Tomorrow Never Comes" and the Academy of Country Music's 1990 Song of the Year and Video of the Year, "The Dance" (another No. 1). It also features his first hit he wrote entirely in "Not Counting You", another top 10 success.

Notable covers
Punk rock cover artists Me First and the Gimme Gimmes released a version of "Much Too Young (To Feel This Damn Old)" as the first track on their October 2006 album Me First and the Gimme Gimmes Love Their Country.

"If Tomorrow Never Comes" has been covered by Ronan Keating (former lead singer of Irish group Boyzone), and many other famous singers including Barry Manilow.

Moe Bandy previously recorded "Nobody Gets Off in This Town" on his 1988 album No Regrets.

Commercial performance
Garth Brooks peaked at No. 13 on the US Billboard 200, and peaked at No. 2 on the Top Country Albums. In November 2006, it was certified diamond by the Recording Industry Association of America (RIAA) for shipments of over ten million copies in the United States. To date, the album has shipped ten million copies in the US.

Track listing
Original Release

Limited Series Release

Personnel

Bruce Bouton – pedal steel guitar
Garth Brooks – vocals, acoustic guitar
Mark Casstevens – acoustic guitar
Mike Chapman – bass guitar
Kathy Chiavola – backing vocals on "Alabama Clay"
Charles Cochran – string arrangements
Rob Hajacos – fiddle
Wendy Johnson –  backing vocals on "I've Got A Good Thing Going", "If Tomorrow Never Comes" and "Everytime That It Rains"
Chris Leuzinger – electric guitar
Jennifer O'Brien – backing vocals on "I've Got A Good Thing Going", "If Tomorrow Never Comes" and "Everytime That It Rains"
Wayland Patton – backing vocals on "Alabama Clay"
Milton Sledge – drums
Hurshel Wiginton – harmony and backing vocals
Bobby Wood – keyboards, synthesizer
Curtis Young – backing vocals on "I've Got A Good Thing Going", "If Tomorrow Never Comes" and "Everytime That It Rains"
Nashville String Machine – string section

Charts

Weekly charts

Year-end charts

Singles

Certifications

See also
List of best-selling albums in the United States

References

1989 debut albums
Garth Brooks albums
Capitol Records albums
Albums produced by Allen Reynolds